Aslan bey Safikurdski Aghalar bey oghlu (1881–1937), also known as Aslan bey Safikurdlu was an Azerbaijani statesman who served as the Minister of Labor and Justice of Azerbaijan Democratic Republic and Minister of Postal Service and Telegraph of Azerbaijan Democratic Republic, and was member of Azerbaijani National Council and later Parliament of Azerbaijan.

Early years
Safikurdski was born in 1881, in the village Safikurd, in the Elizavetpol uezd of the Elizavetpol Governorate. After completing his studies at Ganja Gymnasium, he left for Saint Petersburg to attend Saint Petersburg State University. In 1905, he graduated from the Law Department of the university and returned to Ganja becoming the co-chair of Muslim Charity Society and chairman of Actors Society. Throughout his career, Safikurdski worked as the chief prosecutor in the Elizavetpol and Shusha uezds ("counties").

Political career
With the establishment of Azerbaijan Democratic Republic, Safikurdski was elected member to the Executive Committee of Ganja Uyezd. On June 18, 1918, he was a part of the diplomatic delegation of Azerbaijan along with Musavat leader Mammad Amin Rasulzade, Khalil Khasmammadov, Akbar agha Sheykhulislamov which was sent to the conference in Istanbul to seek alliance with the Ottoman government. On December 26, 1918, when the third cabinet of ADR was formed, he was appointed Minister of Postal Service and Telegraph. The third government was dismissed on March 14, 1919. With formation of the fourth cabinet of ADR, Safikurdski was appointed the Minister of Labor and Justice. He's often credited for his labor reforms and salary increased for government workers.

After Bolshevik takeover of Azerbaijan on April 28, 1920, Safikurdski held various positions within the legal system of Azerbaijan, among them a position of a Deputy Commissar at the Ministry of Justice of Azerbaijan SSR and legal council to Azeroil Union. He died from long-term illness in 1937.

See also
Azerbaijani National Council
Cabinets of Azerbaijan Democratic Republic (1918-1920)
Current Cabinet of Azerbaijan Republic

References

1881 births
1937 deaths
Azerbaijan Democratic Republic politicians
Government ministers of Azerbaijan
Soviet rehabilitations
Politicians from Ganja, Azerbaijan
Members of the National Assembly of the Azerbaijan Democratic Republic
Russian Constituent Assembly members
Azerbaijani socialists
Jurists from Ganja, Azerbaijan